The 1979 Mauritanian coup d'état was a military coup in Mauritania which took place on 6 April 1979. The coup was led by Colonel Ahmed Ould Bouceif and Colonel Mohamed Khouna Ould Haidalla, who seized power from the President, Colonel Mustafa Ould Salek, and the 20-member ruling Military Committee for National Recovery (CMRN), a military junta which was created following an earlier coup in 1978.

The coup resulted in the dismissal of the CMRN and the formation of the 24-member Military Committee for National Salvation (CMSN), a new junta initially under the presidency of Salek as a figurehead, until his resignation on 3 June. He was succeeded by Lieutenant Colonel Mohamed Mahmoud Ould Louly. Bouceif was appointed Prime Minister, and served until his death in an airplane crash in Senegal on 27 May. He was succeeded by Haidalla on 31 May.

References 

Military coups in Mauritania
1970s coups d'état and coup attempts
History of Mauritania
Coup
Conflicts in 1979
April 1979 events in Africa